Ula is a small seaside village in the Tjølling district in Larvik municipality, Vestfold County, Norway. It had the status of tettsted (urban settlement) until 2003, when the population  dropped below 200. The village and harbour become busier during summer months, due to an influx of people occupying Ula's many vacation homes and campgrounds. A number of protected and preserved 18th century wooden homes are located along the main beach.

Tourism
Ula is located on the Vestfold coast about halfway between the cities of Sandefjord and Larvik, and is a popular summer holiday destination surrounded by Cabins and vacation homes. The sandy beach at Ula is one of the longest in the region. The sheltered harbour caters to pleasure craft and a small commercial fishing fleet. Towards Kjerringvik are large recreational areas, made available to the public by Oslofjordens Friluftsråd, a council for the advancement of outdoor activities, in partnership with the state and Larvik municipality.

A former pilot station, the village is linked to the pilot "Ulabrand" (Anders Jacob Johansen), who ran his business from Ula and died in the waters off its coast in November 1881. A monument in his memory has been erected on the hill right above where he lived.

References

Villages in Vestfold og Telemark
Larvik